The Czech Academy of Sciences (abbr. CAS, abbr. AV ČR) was established in 1992 by the Czech National Council as the Czech successor of the former Czechoslovak Academy of Sciences and its tradition goes back to the Royal Bohemian Society of Sciences (founded in 1784) and the Emperor Franz Joseph Czech Academy for Sciences, Literature and Arts (founded in 1890). The academy is the leading non-university public research institution in the Czech Republic. It conducts both fundamental and strategic applied research.

It has three scientific divisions, namely the Division of Mathematics, Physics, and Earth Sciences, Division of Chemical and Life Sciences, and Division of Humanities and Social Sciences. The academy currently manages a network of sixty research institutes and five supporting units staffed by a total of 6,400 employees, over one half of whom are university-trained researchers and Ph.D. scientists.

The Head Office of the academy and forty research institutes are located in Prague, the remaining institutes being situated throughout the country.

History
The establishment of the academy in 1992 follows several previous organizations:
 Royal Czech Society of Doctrines (Královská česká společnost nauk), 1784–1952
  (Česká akademie věd a umění), 1890–1952
 Czechoslovak Academy of Sciences (Československá akademie věd), 1953-1992

In 2010 the academy adopted an open access policy to make its research outputs free to read and reuse.

Institutes of the Czech Academy of Sciences 

The official structure of the CAS consists of three areas (sciences about inanimate nature, life sciences, and humanities),
each with three sections. Each of these 9 sections contains between 4 and 8 institutes. An institute is divided further into departments, laboratories, or working teams, depending on the size and the topic of the institute.

The Area of the Sciences About Inanimate Nature

Section 1: Mathematics, Physics, and Informatics 
 Astronomical institute (Astronomický ústav), founded in 1954
 Institute of Physics
 Institute of Mathematics
 Institute of Computer Science (ICS)
 Nuclear Physics Institute
 Institute of Information Theory and Automation of the CAS (UTIA), founded in 1959

Section 2: Applied Physics 
 Institute of Photonics and Electronics
 Institute of Physics of Materials
 Institute of Plasma Physics
 Institute of Hydrodynamics
 Institute of Scientific Instruments
 Institute of Thermomechanics
 Institute of Theoretical and Applied Mechanics

Section 3: Earth Sciences 
 Institute of Geophysics (GFÚ), founded in 1920 (as the State Institute of Geophysics)
 Institute of Geology
 Institute of Atmospheric Physics, established in 1964
 Institute of Geonics
 Institute of Rock Structure and Mechanics

The Area of Life Sciences and Chemical Sciences

Section 4: Chemical Sciences 
 Institute of Inorganic Chemistry
 J. Heyrovský Institute of Physical Chemistry (Ústav fyzikální chemie Jaroslava Heyrovského, named after Jaroslav Heyrovský; abbreviated: JHI respectively UFCH JH), established in 1972 – merger of the Institute of Physical Chemistry and the Institute of Polarography
 Institute of Chemical Process Fundamentals, founded in 1960
 Institute of Analytical Chemistry
 Institute of Macromolecular Chemistry

Section 5: Biological and Medical Sciences 
 Institute of Biophysics
 Biotechnology Institute
 Institute of Physiology
 Institute of Microbiology
 Institute of Experimental Botany
 Institute of Experimental Medicine
 Institute of Molecular Genetics
 Institute of Animal Physiology and Genetics

Section 6: Biological and Ecological Sciences 
 Biology Centre
 Institute of Botany
 Institute of Vertebrate Biology
 Institute of Systems Biology and Ecology

The Area of Humanities and Social Sciences

Section 7: Social Sciences and Economy 
 Economics Institute (EI) (departments: Center for Economic Research and Graduate Education (CERGE), founded 1991)
 Institute of Psychology
 Institute of Sociology
 Institute of State and Law

Section 8: History 
 Institute of Archaeology (Prague)
 Institute of Archaeology (Brno)
 Institute of History
 Masaryk's Institute and Archives
 Institute of Art History
 Institute of Contemporary History

Section 9: Humanities and Philosophy 
 Institute of Ethnology 
 Institute of Philosophy (and its specialized department Centre for Medieval Studies)
 Oriental Institute
 Institute of Slavonic Studies
 Institute of Czech Literature
 Institute of Czech Language, (Ústav pro jazyk český), founded in 1946

Literature

See also
Amalka Supercomputing facility

References

External links
 Official Web site (in English)

 
Czech Republic
Czech Republic
Science and technology in the Czech Republic
1992 establishments in Czechoslovakia
Scientific organizations established in 1992
Members of the International Council for Science
Members of the International Science Council